The SAO of Romanija was a self-proclaimed ethnic Serb autonomous region within SR Bosnia and Herzegovina in the prelude to the Bosnian War. It was named after the Romanija mountain. It included parts of three municipalities with a population of 37,000.

History

It existed from 1991 to 1992 when it became part of Republika Srpska. Actually it is related to the former Region of Sarajevo-Romanija, inside the historical Romanija.
indeed it was established in September 1991 and was merged with SAO Birač in November 1991 to form the SAO Romanija-Birač. In March 1992 the SAOs were unified into the Serb Republic of Bosnia and Herzegovina, renamed to Republika Srpska on 12 August.

See also
SAO Bosanska Krajina
SAO North-Eastern Bosnia
SAO Eastern Herzegovina

References

External links
 Map

States and territories disestablished in 1992
States and territories established in 1991
History of Republika Srpska
Separatism in Bosnia and Herzegovina